The following highways are numbered 923:

Canada

Costa Rica
 National Route 923

United States